These are the results from the open water swimming competition at the 1994 World Aquatics Championships, which took place in Rome, Italy.

Medal table

Medal summary

Men

Women

1994 in swimming
Open water swimming
Open water swimming at the World Aquatics Championships